Hidden Valley High School is a public high school in Grants Pass, Oregon, United States.

Academics
In 2008, 68% of the school's seniors received a high school diploma. Of 228 students, 155 graduated, 43 dropped out, three received a modified diploma, and 27 were still in high school the following year.

Students
Hidden Valley primarily serves students from the Applegate Valley, the community of Williams and the south Rogue Valley area. The school enrolls roughly 600 students in grades 9-12. 89% of the students are White, 6% are Hispanic, and 3% are Native American.

In October 2007 the school was listed on a state watch list due to safety issues.

Extracurricular activities
19 Future Business Leaders of America (FBLA) students qualified for the National FBLA competition finals, held in Denver, Colorado in July 2004. In 2008, they won their seventh consecutive state title.

Athletics

State championships
 Boys' cross country - 2008
 Boys' basketball - 2006
 Girls' soccer - 2006, 2007
 Boys' soccer - 1993, 2000

Notable alumni
 Ty Burrell, actor, Modern Family

References

High schools in Josephine County, Oregon
Grants Pass, Oregon
Public high schools in Oregon